Ismael Mahmoud Ghassab (born 1 January 1961) is a Jordanian long-distance runner. He competed in the marathon at the 1984 Summer Olympics.

References

1961 births
Living people
Athletes (track and field) at the 1984 Summer Olympics
Jordanian male long-distance runners
Jordanian male marathon runners
Olympic athletes of Jordan
Place of birth missing (living people)
20th-century Jordanian people